Joe or Joseph Egan may refer to:
Joe Egan (boxing), Irish boxer
Joe Egan (musician) (born 1946), Scottish musician
Joe Egan (Paralympian) (born 1953), Australian Paralympian
Joe Egan (rugby league) (1919–2012), English rugby league footballer and coach
Joseph F. Egan (1917–1964), American lawyer and politician from New York
Joseph V. Egan (born 1938), American politician from New Jersey